Gaming and Leisure Properties, Inc. is a real estate investment trust (REIT) specializing in casino properties, based in Wyomissing, Pennsylvania.  It was formed in November 2013 as a corporate spin-off from Penn National Gaming. The company owns 57 casino properties, all of which are leased to other companies.

History
The company was created as a corporate spin-off from Penn National Gaming (now Penn Entertainment), effective November 1, 2013. The corporate breakup was designed to increase investor returns by taking advantage of the lack of federal income taxes on REITs.

In November 2013, GLPI agreed to finance a proposed billion-dollar casino in Milford, Massachusetts, but the project was killed days later when town voters rejected the casino.

In January 2014, the company acquired the real estate assets of the Casino Queen in East St. Louis, Illinois for $140 million, and leased them back to the casino's operating company for $14 million a year. GLPI also loaned $43 million to the casino.

The company's Argosy Casino in Sioux City, Iowa was forced to close in July 2014, and GLPI then sold the casino's real estate.

In May 2014, GLPI agreed to buy The Meadows Racetrack and Casino in western Pennsylvania from Cannery Casino Resorts for $465 million. The company said it would sell the facility's license to a third-party operator, while retaining ownership of the land and buildings. The deal ran into trouble, with GLPI filing a lawsuit accusing Cannery of fraud in October 2014; the lawsuit was eventually settled with an agreement on a reduced purchase price of $440 million.

After casino operator Pinnacle Entertainment announced its own plan in November 2014 to spin-off a REIT with the real estate assets of its 15 casinos, GLPI approached Pinnacle with an offer to buy those assets, which it said would be simpler and faster than Pinnacle's plan. Pinnacle did not respond to the offer, so GLPI went public with its offer in March 2015. In July, the companies reached a deal for GLPI to buy 14 of Pinnacle's 15 properties for $4.75 billion in stock, and lease them back to Pinnacle, with rent starting at $377 million per year. The acquisition was completed in April 2016. GLPI also completed its purchase of The Meadows in September 2016 and sold the racetrack operation to Pinnacle for $138 million.

In May 2015, GLPI agreed to finance the real estate portion of a proposed $650-million casino in New Bedford, Massachusetts, but the plan was canceled months later after developers failed to secure the rest of the needed funding.

In May 2017, GLPI purchased the real estate assets of Bally's Casino Tunica and Resorts Casino Tunica for a total of $83 million, while Penn National simultaneously acquired their operating assets.

In October 2018, the company acquired the real estate of five casinos from Tropicana Entertainment for $964 million. The purchase was part of a three-way deal in which Eldorado Resorts simultaneously acquired Tropicana's operating business and leased the casinos from GLPI for a total of $88 million per year.

Weeks later, GLPI completed a four-way deal that saw its two largest tenants combine into one, as Penn National acquired Pinnacle. GLPI also gained a new tenant in Boyd Gaming, which purchased the operations of three of Pinnacle's leased properties. In connection with the merger, GLPI acquired the real estate of Plainridge Park Casino from Penn National for $250 million, and lent $58 million to Boyd to acquire the real estate of Belterra Park. GLPI later acquired ownership of Belterra Park in satisfaction of the loan.

In April 2020, during the COVID-19 pandemic, Penn National faced the prospect of financial issues brought on by resort closures. As a result, it sold the real estate of the Tropicana Las Vegas to GLPI for $338 million in rent credits. Penn National would continue to operate the Tropicana for another two years, or until the resort were sold.

GLPI took ownership of Lumière Place from Caesars Entertainment (formerly Eldorado Resorts) in October 2020, in satisfaction of a $246 million loan.

In 2021, GLPI sold the operations of its two owned-and-operated casinos for a total of $59 million, to focus on its core business of real estate. The operating business of Hollywood Casino Perryville was sold to Penn National, while that of Hollywood Casino Baton Rouge was sold to Casino Queen.

In June 2021, GLPI added Bally's Corporation as a new tenant, purchasing the Dover Downs racino for $144 million. GLPI also agreed to sell the operations of the Tropicana Las Vegas to Bally's and to buy two other casinos from Bally's for $150 million, and obtained a right of first refusal to buy future casinos developed by Bally's. Two more properties (Bally's Tiverton and Hard Rock Hotel & Casino Biloxi) were acquired from Bally's in 2023 for $635 million.

In December 2021, GLPI reached a deal with the Cordish Companies to purchase three casino properties (Live Casino Philadelphia, Live Casino Maryland, and Live Casino Pittsburgh) for a total of $1.8 billion and lease them back for a total of $125 million per year, and to partner with Cordish in future casino projects. The purchase was completed in March 2022.

Properties
Gaming and Leisure Properties owns the following properties:

Leased to Bally's Corporation
 Bally's Black Hawk — Black Hawk, Colorado
 Bally's Dover — Dover, Delaware
 Bally's Evansville — Evansville, Indiana
 Bally's Quad Cities — Rock Island, Illinois
 Bally's Tiverton — Tiverton, Rhode Island
 Hard Rock Hotel & Casino Biloxi — Biloxi, Mississippi
 Tropicana Las Vegas — Paradise, Nevada (land only)

Leased to Boyd Gaming
 Ameristar Casino Hotel Kansas City — Kansas City, Missouri
 Ameristar Casino Resort Spa St. Charles — St. Charles, Missouri
 Belterra Casino Resort & Spa — Florence, Indiana
 Belterra Park — Anderson Township, Ohio

Leased to Caesars Entertainment
Horseshoe St. Louis — St. Louis, Missouri
Isle Casino Bettendorf — Bettendorf, Iowa
Isle Casino Waterloo — Waterloo, Iowa
Tropicana Atlantic City — Atlantic City, New Jersey
Tropicana Laughlin — Laughlin, Nevada
Trop Casino Greenville — Greenville, Mississippi

Leased to Cordish Companies
Live Casino & Hotel Maryland — Hanover, Maryland
Live Casino & Hotel Philadelphia — Philadelphia, Pennsylvania
Live Casino Pittsburgh — Hempfield Township, Pennsylvania

Leased to CQ Holding
Belle of Baton Rouge — Baton Rouge, Louisiana
DraftKings at Casino Queen — East St. Louis, Illinois
Hollywood Casino Baton Rouge — Baton Rouge, Louisiana

Leased to Penn Entertainment

Casinos
Ameristar Casino Council Bluffs — Council Bluffs, Iowa
Ameristar Casino Hotel East Chicago — East Chicago, Indiana
Ameristar Casino Vicksburg — Vicksburg, Mississippi
Ameristar Casino Resort Spa Black Hawk — Black Hawk, Colorado
Argosy Casino Alton — Alton, Illinois
Argosy Casino Riverside — Riverside, Missouri
Boomtown Biloxi — Biloxi, Mississippi
Boomtown Bossier City — Bossier City, Louisiana
Boomtown New Orleans — Harvey, Louisiana
Cactus Petes Resort Casino — Jackpot, Nevada
1st Jackpot Casino Tunica — Tunica Resorts, Mississippi
Hollywood Casino Aurora — Aurora, Illinois
Hollywood Casino Columbus — Columbus, Ohio
Hollywood Casino Gulf Coast — Bay St. Louis, Mississippi
Hollywood Casino Joliet — Joliet, Illinois
Hollywood Casino Lawrenceburg — Lawrenceburg, Indiana
Hollywood Casino Perryville — Perryville, Maryland
Hollywood Casino St. Louis — Maryland Heights, Missouri
Hollywood Casino Toledo — Toledo, Ohio
Hollywood Casino Tunica — Tunica Resorts, Mississippi
Horseshu Hotel and Casino — Jackpot, Nevada
L'Auberge Casino & Hotel Baton Rouge — Baton Rouge, Louisiana
L'Auberge Casino Resort Lake Charles — Lake Charles, Louisiana
M Resort — Henderson, Nevada
Resorts Casino Tunica — Tunica Resorts, Mississippi (closed)
River City Casino — St. Louis, Missouri

Racinos
Hollywood Casino at Charles Town Races — Charles Town, West Virginia
Hollywood Casino at Penn National Race Course — Grantville, Pennsylvania
Hollywood Casino Hotel & Raceway Bangor — Bangor, Maine
Hollywood Gaming at Dayton Raceway — Dayton, Ohio
Hollywood Gaming at Mahoning Valley Race Course — Austintown, Ohio
The Meadows Racetrack and Casino — North Strabane Township, Pennsylvania
Plainridge Park Casino — Plainville, Massachusetts
Zia Park Casino Hotel & Racetrack — Hobbs, New Mexico

Former properties
Argosy Casino Sioux City — Sioux City, Iowa

References

External links

Companies based in Berks County, Pennsylvania
Real estate companies established in 2013
Gambling companies established in 2013
American companies established in 2013
Gambling companies of the United States
Real estate investment trusts of the United States
2013 establishments in Pennsylvania
Companies listed on the Nasdaq
Corporate spin-offs